Kappa is a village in Woodford County, Illinois, United States. The population was 227 at the 2010 census, up from 170 in 2000. It is part of the Peoria, Illinois Metropolitan Statistical Area.

In 1833 Thomas Dixon became the first settler in the Kappa area. Over the next few years, other settlers moved in around the area, and eventually a railroad was built through the area. On May 23, 1853, rail service began, and postal service began. The first postmaster, William Jones, appointed the name Montrose, but the Illinois Central Railroad preferred Kappa. Kappa is the tenth letter in the Greek alphabet, and was applied to the town because it was the tenth town between Dunleith (modern-day East Dubuque, Illinois) and Bloomington.

Kappa sits on the north side of the Mackinaw River. Approximately five miles to the southeast is Lake Bloomington, while five miles to the southwest is Evergreen Lake.

Since its inception, the railroad line from East Dubuque to Bloomington has been decommissioned. In the early 1900s, SBI Route 2 was founded, and then changed to U.S. Route 51. U.S. 51 now bypasses the town to the west, leaving Illinois Route 251 as the main north–south road through town.

Geography
Kappa is located at  (40.676439, -89.009349).

Demographics

As of the census of 2000, there were 170 people, 63 households, and 48 families residing in the village. The racial makeup of the village was 97.06% White, 1.18% Native American, 1.76% from other races. Hispanic or Latino of any race were 2.35% of the population.

There were 63 households, out of which 47.6% had children under the age of 18 living with them, 58.7% were married couples living together, 9.5% had a female householder with no husband present, and 23.8% were non-families. 20.6% of all households were made up of individuals, and 6.3% had someone living alone who was 65 years of age or older. The average household size was 2.70 and the average family size was 3.08.

In the village, the population was spread out, with 32.4% under the age of 18, 5.9% from 18 to 24, 34.1% from 25 to 44, 19.4% from 45 to 64, and 8.2% who were 65 years of age or older. The median age was 32 years. For every 100 females, there were 97.7 males. For every 100 females age 18 and over, there were 94.9 males.

The median income for a household in the village was $46,786, and the median income for a family was $50,417. Males had a median income of $35,417 versus $21,250 for females. The per capita income for the village was $17,451. About 6.0% of families and 9.6% of the population were below the poverty line, including 14.6% of those under the age of eighteen and 12.5% of those 65 or over.

Attractions

Recreation and entertainment
The small village's main attraction is the Kappa Gentlemens Club, a strip club that has been the subject of multiple legal cases, including a prostitution bust as part of an undercover sting operation in 2008.

References

External links
Kappa, Illinois, Early Families and History

Villages in Illinois
Villages in Woodford County, Illinois
Peoria metropolitan area, Illinois
Populated places established in 1833
1833 establishments in Illinois